M-alpha-HMCA (3-(benzo[d][1,3]dioxol-5-yl)-2-hydroxy-N,2-dimethyl-3-(methylamino)propanamide) is an unintentional sideproduct during the synthesis of MDMA using PMK glycidate as a precursor. It was identified in MDMA pills. The biological properties of this molecule have not yet been documented. The backbone of the chemical structure is M-alpha whose psychoactive activity has been described by Alexander Shulgin.

References 

Amides
Amines
Benzodioxoles